John Craine may refer to:

 John W. Craine Jr. (born 1945), United States Navy admiral 
 John Pares Craine (died 1977), American Episcopal bishop